Mustaque Ahmed Ruhi (born June 19, 1974) is a Public Figure and member of the 9th Parliament. In 2008, he was elected as a member of the Bangladesh Awami League nominee in the general election. He is a former AGS and VP consecutively of Ananda Mohan College Central Students Union(AMUCSU)

Early life
Ruhi was born on 19 June 1974.

Ruhi got a scholarship with Talentpool from Netrakona Government Primary School. Then he was admitted to the Government Anjuman School. In 1989, he got 'Star Marks' and passed the secondary examination from Mymensingh Zilla School. Ruhi completed Higher Secondary, Honors and MMS in Ananda Mohan University College respectively in 1991, 1994 and 1996.

Career 

Ruhi was elected to parliament on 29 December 2008 as a candidate of Awami League from Netrakona-1 defeating Kayser Kamal of Bangladesh Nationalist Party.

Ruhi raised the question of the disappearance of four individuals in his constituency in February 2011 and asked Minister of Home Affairs what steps could be taken.

Published books
In Bengali 
 Rajniti Ha Ya Ba Ra La 
 Janata Jibonmrita
 Pakritik gas-er sondhane

See also
 Manu Majumdar 
 2008 Bangladeshi general election 
 2014 Bangladeshi general election

References

External links
 Personal website of Ruhi 

9th Jatiya Sangsad members
Awami League politicians
Living people
People from Netrokona District
1974 births